Muammer Zülfikar Yıldırım (born 10 July 1990), is a Turkish professional football player who plays as a goalkeeper for Sivasspor.

Career

Mersin İdmanyurdu
Yıldırım played his first Süper Lig game against Balıkesirspor which ended 3–1 in favour of Mersin İY, at Balıkesir Atatürk Stadı, on 4 May 2015. He finished 2014–15 season with a total of 9 games, including 7 Süper Lig and 2 Ziraat Turkish Cup games. Following farewell of his teammate Bulgarian goalie Nikolay Mihaylov, he played at entire Süper Lig fixture of Mersin İY at the first-halve of 2015–16 Süper Lig season.

Kayserispor
Yıldırım signed in Kayserispor for a 3-year-deal on 21 July 2016. He earned his first cap for Kayserispor on Week 3 of 2016–17 Süper Lig season on away, against Galatasaray, ended 0–0, on 10 September 2016.

International
Yıldırım received his first call-up to the Turkey national football team for their friendly against Austria in March 2016.

Honours
Sivasspor
 Turkish Cup: 2021–22

References

External links
 Profile at TFF 

1990 births
Living people
Sportspeople from Diyarbakır
Turkish footballers
Association football goalkeepers
Süper Lig players
Türk Telekom G.S.K. footballers
Mersin İdman Yurdu footballers
Kayserispor footballers
Sivasspor footballers